The XR650L is a dual-sport motorcycle manufactured by Honda, part of the Honda XR series. It was released in 1992 as a 1993 model. It combines the RFVC engine from the proven NX650 Dominator dual sport with the lighter, off-road capable XR600R chassis, which is not road legal in the US (the XR600R). It has been produced virtually unchanged since 1993 and is still in production as of 2022. 

The engine is a 40 hp, air-cooled  SOHC, dry-sump, single-cylinder, four-stroke. With an electric starter, headlight, taillight, turn signals, mirrors, US EPA and California Air Resources Board (CARB) compliant exhaust system, and a  metallic fuel tank, the 650L has a  wet weight.

Notes

External links
https://www.cycleworld.com/2012/07/18/honda-xr650l-best-used-bikes/

XR650L